Chris Ashby is a Republican campaign finance and election lawyer. He and Kahlil Byrd are co-founders of the 501(c) Stand Up America which supported.the independent presidential candidacy of Evan McMullin.
1

References

Year of birth missing (living people)
Living people
American lawyers
Republican Party (United States) politicians